Isjuminella is a species of extinct  brachiopods, a marine rhynchonellate lampshell in the family Tetrarhynchiidae.

These stationary epifaunal suspension feeders lived in the Late Jurassic period.

References

Prehistoric brachiopod genera